Ernei is a commune in Mureș County, Transylvania, Romania, composed of six villages: Călușeri (Székelykál), Dumbrăvioara (Sáromberke), Ernei, Icland (Ikland), Săcăreni (Székes), and Sângeru de Pădure (Erdőszengyel).

Geography
The commune is situated on the Transylvanian Plateau, on the left bank of the Mureș River.

History

Ernei formed part of the Székely Land region of the historical Transylvania province. Until 1876, it fall within Marosszék, thereafter until 1918, the village belonged to the Maros-Torda County of the Kingdom of Hungary. After  After the Hungarian–Romanian War of 1918–19 and the Treaty of Trianon of 1920, it became part of the Kingdom of Romania. As a result of the Second Vienna Award, it belonged to Hungary again between 1940 and 1944. After World War II, it returned to Romanian administration. Between 1952 and 1960, it formed part of the Magyar Autonomous Region, then, of the Mureș-Magyar Autonomous Region until it was abolished in 1968. Since then, the commune is part of Mureș County.

Demographics
The commune has an absolute Székely Hungarian majority. According to the 2011 census, it has a population of 5,835, of which 73.42% were Hungarian, 16.33% Roma, and 7.75% Romanian. It reached its maximum population in 1966 with 6,014 people.

Broadcasting transmitter
South of Ernei at 46°35'35"N 24°38'0"E, there is a mediumwave transmitter working on 1323 kHz with a power of 15 kW. This transmitter occasionally broadcasts sometimes in German language.

Natives
Elek Köblös

See also
 Prehistory of Transylvania
 Wietenberg culture
 Mycenae
 List of Hungarian exonyms (Mureș County)

Notes

External links 

 Nagyernye Reformed Church Congregation 

Communes in Mureș County
Localities in Transylvania